Felicia Keesing is an ecologist and the David & Rosalie Rose Distinguished Chair of the Sciences, Mathematics, and Computing at Bard College in Annandale-on-Hudson, New York.

Education
Keesing received her B.S. in Symbolic Systems from Stanford University in 1987 and her Ph.D. in Integrative Biology from the University of California at Berkeley in 1997.

Research
Keesing's research focuses on the consequences of human impacts, particularly biodiversity loss, for ecological communities. In Kenya, she has studied how the absence of large mammals like giraffes and elephants affects savanna ecology. She and Richard Ostfeld pioneered research on the ecology of Lyme disease, in particular how human risk for Lyme disease is affected by forest fragmentation and the loss of biodiversity. She and Ostfeld also developed core ideas about the general relationship between biodiversity loss and the emergence and transmission of infectious diseases, and a conceptual model of the effects of pulsed resources on ecological communities. 

From 2016 to 2021, she and Ostfeld co-directed the Tick Project, a study to test whether environmental interventions could prevent Lyme and other tick-borne diseases in residential neighborhoods of Dutchess County, New York.

Keesing's recent research in Kenya focuses on the ecological, economic, and social consequences of managing land in Laikipia County, Kenya for livestock, wildlife, or both. 

In 2009, she served on the steering committee for the Vision and Change initiative to reform the teaching of undergraduate biology, and from 2012 to 2017, with funding from the Howard Hughes Medical Institute, she directed a project on science literacy for college students. In 2017, she led the development of the curriculum for the Citizen Science program at Bard College.

Awards and recognition
Keesing received a National Science Foundation CAREER Award and a Presidential Early Career Award for Scientists and Engineers in 1999. She is a fellow of the Ecological Society of America (2019) and a fellow of the American Association for the Advancement of Science (2021). In 2022, she was awarded the International Cosmos Prize.

Selected publications

References 

Living people
Bard College faculty
Stanford University alumni
University of California, Berkeley alumni
1966 births
American Association for the Advancement of Science
American ecologists

Fellows of the Ecological Society of America